Remembrance is a Christian metalcore band formed during the winter of 2003 in Lansing, Michigan.  They played shows with bands such as Underoath, Maylene & The Sons of Disaster, Advent, Saints Never Surrender, War of Ages, Common Yet Forbidden, No Innocent Victim, Aletheian, Dagon, and The Burial. Remembrance released two independent EPs before releasing their full-length label debut Beyond the Scope of Reason in May 2007 on Sancrosanct Records [sic].
They broke up in 2008. Matthew Weir moved on to play drums for Sleeping Giant. Tony Padilla continued to run Sancrosanct Records, the label the band was signed to.

Members
Last Known Line-up
Adam Klein - Vocals (2003-2008)
Jeff Schantz - Guitar
Joel Matthews - Guitar
Aaron Woods - Bass
Matthew Weir - Drums

Former members
Tony Padilla - Lead Guitar
Josh Reed - Guitar
Damon Reed - Bass
Erin Conlin - Bass
Tab - Bass
Jim Conlin - Drums

Discography
EPs
A Diary of Hope and Heartache - (2004) (Independent EP)
Under Angel's Wings - (2006) (Independent EP).
Albums
''Beyond the Scope of Reason - (2007) (Sancrosanct Records).

References

External links
Remembrance on MySpace

Musical groups from Michigan
Musical groups established in 2003
Musical groups disestablished in 2008
2003 establishments in Michigan